The Rehearsals is a 2013 Russian drama film directed by Oksana Karas.

Plot 
The film tells about the theater artist Alexander and the successful actor Igor, who live together, but constantly postpone later resolving issues related to family life. Alexandra got tired of it and she started a new romance.

Cast 
 Nikita Efremov as Igor Gradsky
 Aleksandra Vinogradova as Aleksandra Sukhanova
 Igor Yatsko as Director Dmitri Nikolayevich
 Yana Gladkikh as Sasha
 Irina Denisova as Inga
 Pyotr Fyodorov as Actor Fedya Petrov
 Aleksandr Yatsenko as Neighbour
 Sakhat Dursunov as Doctor Ruben Mikhaylovich
 Tatyana Orlova as Nurse
 Azamat Nigmanov

References

External links 
 

2013 films
2010s Russian-language films
Russian drama films
2013 drama films